María Fernanda Romero Lozano (born 15 April 1986) is a Mexican politician affiliated with the National Regeneration Movement. As of 2013 she served as Deputy of the LXII Legislature of the Mexican Congress representing Tabasco.

References

1986 births
Living people
Politicians from Tabasco
Women members of the Chamber of Deputies (Mexico)
Citizens' Movement (Mexico) politicians
Morena (political party) politicians
21st-century Mexican politicians
21st-century Mexican women politicians
Autonomous University of Nuevo León alumni
Deputies of the LXII Legislature of Mexico
Members of the Chamber of Deputies (Mexico) for Tabasco